Anja Nobus (born 9 April 1974) is a Belgian cyclist. She participates in both road cycling and in cyclo-cross. In 2002 and 2004 she became Belgian national champion in cyclo-cross, and in 2003 she became Belgian road race champion.

Palmarès

2001
2nd Belgian National Cyclo-cross Championships

2002
1st  Belgian National Cyclo-cross Championships

2003
1st  Belgian National Road Race Championships
1st Gravere-Asper
2nd Belgian National Cyclo-cross Championships
1st Lille, Belgium
3rd Hoogerheide
3rd Kalmthout

2004
1st  Belgian National Cyclo-cross Championships
3rd Oostmalle
2nd Gravere-Asper

2005
2nd Belgian National Cyclo-cross Championships
1st Lille, Belgium
3rd Gravere-Asper

2006
3rd Belgian National Cyclo-cross Championships
2nd Lille, Belgium
3rd Sint-Michielsgestel (2006/07 Cyclo-cross Superprestige)

External links
 

Living people
1974 births
Belgian female cyclists
Cyclo-cross cyclists
Sportspeople from Bruges
Cyclists from West Flanders
Belgian cyclo-cross champions
21st-century Belgian women